Cheke's day gecko (Phelsuma abbotti chekei) is a subspecies of day gecko, a lizard in the family Gekkonidae.

Etymology
The subspecific name, chekei, is in honor of British ornithologist Anthony S. Cheke.

Distribution
P. a. chekei is found on the island of Madagascar.

Diet
P. a. chekei primarily eats insects and fruits.

Reproduction
P. a. chekei is oviparous.

References

Further reading
Börner A-R, Minuth W (1984). "On the taxonomy of the Indian Ocean Lizards of the Phelsuma madagascariensis species group (Reptilia: Gekkonidae)". Journal of the Bombay Natural History Society 81 (2): 243–281. (Phelsuma chekei, new species, p. 259).
Glaw F, Vences M (1994). A Fieldguide to the Amphibians and Reptiles of Madagascar, Second Edition. Cologne, Germany: Vences & Glaw Verlag / Serpents Tale. 480 pp. .
Meier H, Böhme W (1996). "Zum taxonomischen Status des Formenkreises von Phelsuma abbotti STEJNEGER, 1893, mit Bemerkungen über P. masohoala RAXWORTHY & NUSSBAUM, 1994 ". Salamandra 32 (2): 85–98. (in German, with an abstract in English).

Phelsuma